The 2022 Howard Bison men's soccer team represents Howard University during the 2021 NCAA Division I men's soccer season. They are led by eight year head coach Phillip Gyau.

Roster 
The 2021-2022 roster for the Howard Men's Bison.

Players arriving 
Howard signed these players during the 2022 recruiting period.

Player Statistics

References

Howard Bison men's soccer seasons